El Salvador competed at the 2015 World Championships in Athletics in Beijing, China, from 22 to 30 August 2015.

Results
(q – qualified, NM – no mark, SB – season best)

Men 
Field events

Women 
Track and road events

References

Nations at the 2015 World Championships in Athletics
World Championships in Athletics
El Salvador at the World Championships in Athletics